Istiblennius edentulus, the rippled rockskipper, is a species of combtooth blenny found in coral reefs in the Pacific and Indian Oceans. It is also commonly known as the rippled blenny, smooth-lipped blenny, toothless blenny, or coral blenny. Males of this species can reach a maximum of  TL, while females can reach a maximum of  SL.

References

External links
 

edentulus
Fish described in 1801